Suluk Subdistrict or Suluk Nahiyah  is a Syrian Nahiyah (Subdistrict) located in Tell Abyad District in Raqqa.  According to the Syria Central Bureau of Statistics (CBS), Suluk Subdistrict had a population of 44,131 in the 2004 census.

References 

Subdistricts of Raqqa Governorate